The 1897 World Allround Speed Skating Championships took place on 5, 6 and 9 February 1897 at the ice rink Crystal Stadium in Montréal, Canada. It was the first World championship outside of Europe. Canada had the honour of organizing this World championship because it was the first non-European member of the International Skating Union.

Jaap Eden was the defending champion, but he stopped with ice skating after the 1896 season and did not defend his title. He started a career as a cyclist.

The Norwegian Alfred Næss won the first distance (500 meters) and the Canadian Jack McCulloch the second distance (5000 meters). At the third distance (1500 meters), Næss and McCulloch dead-heated for the fastest time, meaning a skate-off was needed to decide who was the winner and still able to win three distances.

After McCulloch won the skate-off, he won the 10000 meters, with only three others starting, and became World Champion.

Two days later, officials discovered an error in measuring the 5000 meter course, meaning the competitors had skated 4200 meters: two laps too few.

The results were annulled, and the next morning (9 February), the 5000 meters was re-skated, though some skaters had already left Canada, meaning only four skaters took part. McCulloch won again, and was confirmed as World Champion.

Allround results 

  * = Fell
 NC = Not classified
 NF = Not finished
 NS = Not started
 DQ = Disqualified
Source: SpeedSkatingStats.com

Rules 
Four distances have to be skated:
 500m
 1500m
 5000m
 10000m

One could only win the World Championships by winning at least three of the four distances, so there would be no World Champion if no skater won at least three distances.

Silver and bronze medals were not awarded.

References 

World Allround Speed Skating Championships, 1897
1897 World Allround
World Allround, 1897
Sports competitions in Montreal
World Allround Speed
World Allround Speed Skating Championships
World Allround Speed Skating Championships
19th century in Montreal